Butcherbird is the twentieth studio album by Australian country music artist John Williamson. It was released on 24 August 2018 and peaked at number 13 on the ARIA Albums Chart.

Topics on the album include life and love, as well as nature—written by Williamson about his bush property in Springbrook, Queensland. Williamson said: "Butcherbird is probably my most relaxed album ever... It's a very honest and reflective album and it was quite a breeze to write. Perhaps because at this stage of my career I had a "what the hell, just do it" attitude. It felt right."

Williamson said the butcherbird is his "favourite feathered singer". He said: "They have been here longer than humans, yet their melodies are remarkably fresh. They are my mates in the garden and have inspired the first track 'The Valley of His Dreams'."

Williamson supported the album with a national in October and November 2018.

At the 2019 Country Music Awards of Australia, Butcherbird was nominated for Traditional Country Album of the Year.

Reception

Dylan Marshall from The AU Review said that while Butcherbird "might not have all that many 'instant' classics, it's still a jolly good jaunt", adding: "His connection with the land and its people, as well as those who built the nation's formative identity, are what makes Williamson a national treasure. Butcherbird isn't ground breaking, but I don't think it needs to be. It's an honest album, and frankly, I'm fine with that."

Track listing

Charts

Weekly charts

Year-end charts

Release history

References

2018 albums
John Williamson (singer) albums
Warner Music Group albums